A centre stick (or center stick in the United States), or simply control stick is an aircraft cockpit arrangement where the control column (or joystick) is located in the center of the cockpit between the pilots or between the pilot's legs. Since the throttle controls are typically located to the left of the pilot, the right hand is used for the stick, although left-hand or both-hands operation is possible if required.

The centre stick is a part of an aircraft's flight control system and is typically linked to its ailerons and elevators, or alternatively to its elevons, by control rods or control cables on basic aircraft. On heavier, faster, more advanced aircraft the centre stick may also control power-assist modules. Modern aircraft centre sticks are also usually equipped with a number of electrical control switches within easy finger reach, in order to reduce the pilot's workload.

The centre stick is used in many military fighter jets such as Eurofighter Typhoon and the Mirage III, but also in light aircraft such as Piper Cubs and the Diamond Aircraft line of products such as the DA20, DA40 and DA42.

This arrangement contrasts with the more recently developed "side-stick", which is used in such military fighter jets as the F-16, the F-35 Lightning II and Rafale and also on civil aircraft such as the Airbus A320.

History 

The centre stick originated at the turn of the twentieth century. In 1900, Wilhelm Kress of Austria developed a control stick for aircraft, but did not apply for a patent. Instead, a patent was awarded to the French aviator, Robert Esnault-Pelterie who applied for it in 1907.

See also
 Aircraft flight control system
 Side-stick
 Yoke (aircraft)

References 

Design
Aircraft controls